Laemonema is a genus of morid cods.

Species
The 17 currently recognized species in this genus are:
 Laemonema barbatulum Goode & T. H. Bean, 1883 (shortbeard codling)
 Laemonema compressicauda (Gilchrist, 1903)
 Laemonema filodorsale Okamura, 1982
 Laemonema goodebeanorum Meléndez C. & Markle, 1997
 Laemonema gracillipes Garman, 1899
 Laemonema laureysi Poll, 1953 (Guinean codling)
 Laemonema longipes P. J. Schmidt, 1938 (longfin codling)
 Laemonema macronema Meléndez C. & Markle, 1997
 Laemonema melanurum Goode & T. H. Bean, 1896
 Laemonema modestum (V. Franz, 1910)
 Laemonema nana Iw. Taki, 1953
 Laemonema palauense Okamura, 1982
 Laemonema rhodochir C. H. Gilbert, 1905
 Laemonema robustum J. Y. Johnson, 1862 (robust mora)
 Laemonema verecundum (D. S. Jordan & Cramer, 1897) (bighead mora)
 Laemonema yarrellii (R. T. Lowe, 1838)
 Laemonema yuvto Parin & Sazonov, 1990

References

Moridae
Taxa named by Albert Günther
Marine fish genera